Green Valley (formerly, La Joya) is a census-designated place in the Sierra Pelona Mountains, in Los Angeles County, California. It lies at an elevation of 2936 feet (895 m). The population was 1,027 at the 2010 census.

History
Widow Smith's Station of the Butterfield Overland Mail was located about a mile south of Green Valley, on the San Francisquito Canyon Road, remained into the 1960s at 38839 San Francisquito Canyon Road.  The building still stands,  the building is believed to have been in use at the time the Butterfield stage line used this route from 1858 to 1861. The station was in existence by 1856, when Harris Newmark says he stayed there overnight when returning to Los Angeles from a meeting at Fort Tejon. This would have been Widow Smith's Station or Gordon's Station, 24 miles southeast from French John's Station (that was located just west of Neenach) and 10 miles north of King's Station located in the lower San Francisquito Canyon.

Geography
According to the United States Census Bureau, the CDP has a total area of 12.8 square miles (33.2 km), all of which is land.

The town is located in the Sierra Pelona within San Francisquito Canyon and lies just a few miles northwest of the Bouquet Reservoir. It is 19 miles (31 km) west of Palmdale and 20 miles (33 km) north of Santa Clarita.

Demographics
At the 2010 census Green Valley had a population of 1,027. The racial makeup of Green Valley was 901 (87.7%) White, 81 (7.8% Non-Hispanic White), 8 (0.8%) African American, 11 (1.1%) Native American, 12 (1.2%) Asian, 1 (0.1%) Pacific Islander, 35 (3.4%) from other races, and 59 (5.7%) from two or more races. Hispanic or Latino of any race were 123 people (12.0%).

The whole population lived in households, no one lived in non-institutionalized group quarters and no one was institutionalized.

There were 443 households, 116 (26.2%) had children under the age of 18 living in them, 214 (48.3%) were married couples living together, 31 (7.0%) had a female householder with no husband present, 39 (8.8%) had a male householder with no wife present.  There were 32 (7.2%) unmarried partnerships, and 3 (0.7%) same-sex married couples or partnerships. 129 households (29.1%) were one person and 29 (6.5%) had someone living alone who was 65 or older. The average household size was 2.32.  There were 284 families (64.1% of households); the average family size was 2.81.

The age distribution was 195 people (19.0%) under the age of 18, 71 people (6.9%) aged 18 to 24, 199 people (19.4%) aged 25 to 44, 429 people (41.8%) aged 45 to 64, and 133 people (13.0%) who were 65 or older.  The median age was 47.0 years. For every 100 females, there were 113.5 males.  For every 100 females age 18 and over, there were 111.7 males.

There were 515 housing units at an average density of 40.2 per square mile, of the occupied units 359 (81.0%) were owner-occupied and 84 (19.0%) were rented. The homeowner vacancy rate was 4.5%; the rental vacancy rate was 2.3%.  862 people (83.9% of the population) lived in owner-occupied housing units and 165 people (16.1%) lived in rental housing units.

According to the United States Census Bureau, Green Valley has a median household income of $83,359, with 7.6% of the population living below the federal poverty line.

In popular culture
Much of the first three seasons of Justified (TV series), set in Harlan County, Kentucky, was filmed in Green Valley.

References

External links
 Major Gordon's Stage Station, historical notes, photos, painting and drawings of Widow Smith's Station.

Census-designated places in Los Angeles County, California
Sierra Pelona Ridge
Census-designated places in California